Michelle Bell is an American singer-songwriter and record producer born in Ohio. Bell started to work on a local paper while she was in college, and used to write to publicists at record labels. After moving to New York City, she went on to work with Sean Combs. Together they wrote and produced tracks for Jennifer Lopez. Following the release of Lopez's album, Bell became known as a songwriter and producer, working with several artists, including Britney Spears, Girls Aloud, Mary J. Blige and Paulina Rubio.

Biography
Michelle Bell was born in Ohio. She said that while she was in college, "I became a junior reporter with a local paper writing about people who grew big tomatoes or had a church band. It was pretty boring stuff but I used the letterhead from the paper to write to publicists at record labels. The entertainment editor wasn't interested in the concerts and stories. I was so I was able to attend many great shows and interview my favorite artists. I met tons of people through the paper so when I moved to NY from Ohio it was easier to get jobs." Bell stated that she was always inclined to work on the music business, commenting that "being ambitious, savvy and slightly obnoxious is how I think you make it as an anything in the entertainment business." She first worked with Sean Combs, who was dating pop singer Jennifer Lopez at the time. After Bell's song was presented to Lopez, the latter recorded the track. Bell said that she "shared a lot," with Lopez and that, "it was fun, we wrote a funny song about something that happened with her assistant. It started from a beat that went terribly wrong. Not for the album but just for fun." Bell then went to work with several artists such as Mary J. Blige and Paulina Rubio over the years.

In 2002, the producer started to work with Britney Spears on her fourth studio album, In the Zone. Together they wrote and recorded several tracks, including "Chaotic", "Like I'm Falling", "Look Who's Talking Now", and "Money, Love, & Happiness". "Britney Spears was awesome. She actually surprised me because she can play the piano. She's down to earth and very nice. She hides it but I think people can tell she's a real artist. I hope someday she gets to bring that side of herself out more. We had a nice time working," commented Bell about the songwriting and recording process with Spears. "(I've Just Begun) Having My Fun", another track recorded by Spears and later released on Greatest Hits: My Prerogative (2004), was featured on the soundtrack of the 2011 film Bridesmaids. Bell later worked with producer Peter Wade Keusch. Together, they formed a music production duo, and worked for artists such as 88-Keys and Lindsay Lohan. They worked together on an album called The Mystery LLP. It was slated for a release on the second quarter of 2008; the album, however, is yet to be released. Bell currently lives in New York City.

Reception
Bell's songs were mostly well received by contemporary critics. One of her tracks she wrote with Britney Spears, "I've Just Begun (Having My Fun)", was considered by Stephen Thomas Erlewine of Allmusic as better "[than] most of the songs that were featured on [In the Zone]," while Mike McGuirk of Rhapsody said the song "is on a level with her best work, namely 'I'm a Slave 4 U'." Bell's tracks included on Jennifer Lopez's album Brave (2007) received mixed to positive reviews, with "I Need Love" being considered as a "nice enough uptempo groove. Still, it's not something you'll be rushing to hear a second time — a sentiment that summarizes most of 'Brave'." "Morning After Dark", a track co-wrote with Timbaland, was considered as "catchy" by reviewers, with its hook receiving positive appreciation. However, Jennifer Lopez's "Come Over" did not impress critics, with Tom Sinclair of Entertainment Weekly saying, "'Come to my room for a little game.… I'll do very erotic things', she breathes on 'Come Over', [...] the most embarrassing satin sheet anthem since, oh, Sylvia's 'Pillow Talk'." The song received comparisons to earlier works of Janet Jackson.

Songwriting discography

 2001: "Come Over" (Jennifer Lopez)
 2001: "Testimony" (Mary J. Blige)
 2001: "Think" (Toya)
 2001: "The Truth" (Toya)
 2001: "What Else Can I Do" (Toya)
 2001: "At The Bar" (T.I.)
 2002: "Doo Rags" (Nas)
 2002: "High Fashion" (3LW)
 2002: "A Girl Can Mack" (3LW)
 2002: "Stereo" (Paulina Rubio)
 2002: "Supernatural" (Sugababes)
 2003: "Impatient" (Blu Cantrell)
 2003: "Don't Want You Back" (Girls Aloud)
 2003: "Chaotic" (Britney Spears)
 2003: "Conscious" (Britney Spears)
 2003: "I've Just Begun (Having My Fun)" (Britney Spears)
 2003: "Look Who's Talking Now" (Britney Spears)
 2003: "Money Love and Happiness" (Britney Spears)
 2003: "Ouch" (Britney Spears)
 2003: "Peep Show" (Britney Spears)
 2003: "Take Off" (Britney Spears)
 2003: “Disguise My Love <small> (Britney Spears)
 2006: "Fire" (Kelis)
 2007: "It Can Happen" (Elisabeth Withers)
 2007: "Get Your Shoes On" (Elisabeth Withers)
 2007: "Be Mine" (Jennifer Lopez)
 2007: "Frozen Moments" (Jennifer Lopez)
 2007: "I Need Love" (Jennifer Lopez)
 2007: "Never Gonna Give Up" (Jennifer Lopez)
 2007: "The Way It Is" (Jennifer Lopez)
 2008: "Almond Joy" (Tittsworth)
 2008: "Portrait of Love"" (Cheri Dennis)
 2008: "Morning Wood" (88-Keys)
 2009: "Morning After Dark" (featuring Soshy and Nelly Furtado) (Timbaland)
 2009: "Can't Hide from Love" (Fame soundtrack)
 2009: "Amazing" (Alex Young)
 2009: "Broken Heart" (Alex Young)
 2009: "Kisses Wishes" (Alex Young)
 2009: "Rendezvous" (Alex Young)
 2009: "Seeing is Believing" (Alex Young)
 2012: "Butterflies" (Medina) 
 2012: "Hotels" (Medina)
 2012: "Good to You" (Medina)
 2013: "The Flow" (Bilal)
 2014: "Relationshit" (Soshy)
 2014"Bang Bang" (Soshy)
 2014 "Need You Now" (Macy Gray)
2014 "Bad Things" (Aneta Sablik)
2014 "Crazy/Rosie" for (Love, Rosie movie)(Michelle Bell)
2015 "Drums Talk" (Maude Herchab)
2015 "Take A Chance" (Antonique Smith)
2015 "Choices" (E-40)
2016 "Something Different" (Clairy Browne)
2016 "Choices" (American Honey) Soundtrack
2017:"Come Alive" (Johnny Manuel)

Notes

References

External links
Michelle Bell at MySpace

Year of birth missing (living people)
Living people
American women singer-songwriters
21st-century American women